Haplochromis brownae is a species of cichlid endemic to Lake Victoria though it may be extinct in the wild.  This species can reach a length of  SL. The identity of the person honoured by this species' specific name is not known but it is thought most likely to be Margaret “Peggy” Brown (1918-2009) who was a visiting scientist with the East African Freshwater Fisheries Research Organization at Jinja, Uganda in 1950 or 1951, where Humphry Greenwood was working.

References 

brownae
Fish of Tanzania
Freshwater fish of Kenya
Fish of Uganda
Fish of Lake Victoria
Fish described in 1962
Taxa named by Humphry Greenwood
Taxonomy articles created by Polbot